Price Hill may refer to:

 Price Hill, Cincinnati, a neighborhood in Cincinnati, Ohio. It includes:
 The Lower Price Hill Historic District (Cincinnati, Ohio)
 Price Hill, West Virginia (disambiguation), several places in West Virginia
 # 3575 Price Hill, a historic railroad passenger car, rebuilt for use on the B&O Cincinnatian trainset.

See also
 Price (disambiguation)
 Mount Price (disambiguation)